Moulay Al-Rashid ibn Sharif, known as Moulay Al-Rashid or Moulay Rachid (also spelt Mulay, Mulai or Mawlay; b. 1631 – d. 9 April 1672), was Sultan of Morocco from 1666 to 1672. He was the son of the founder of the 'Alawi dynasty, Moulay Sharif, who took power in the Tafilalt region in 1631. In 1635 Moulay Rashid's half-brother Sidi Mohammed succeeded their still-living father. During his reign, Sidi Mohammed brought Tafilalt, the Draa River valley, Oujda and the Eastern Sahara region under 'Alawi rule. However, due to internal feuding, war broke out between the brothers and Sidi Mohammed was killed on the battlefield by troops of Moulay Rashid on 2 August 1664. From then on Moulay Rashid became Sultan of Tafilalt and went on to conquer Taza and assert power in Sijilmasa, capital of Tafilalt. He then became the first 'Alawi sultan of Morocco. He ended the rule of the Dilaites, a Berber movement which ruled the northern part of Morocco. After subjugating the northern coastal areas of Morocco, he also succeeded in capturing Marrakesh in 1669. He occupied the Sous and the Anti-Atlas, which solidified 'Alawi control over the entirety of Morocco except for the wild High Atlas Mountains. He re-subdued the Emirate of Tuat after their rebellion following the death of Sultan Muhammad ibn Sharif who conquered it in 1652.

Biography

Youth 
Moulay Rashid was born in 1631 in Sijilmasa. He was born the same year his father Moulay Sharif was crowned Emir of Tafilalt. His father lost power in 1636 and officially abdicated in favor of his eldest son Sidi Mohammed on 23 April 1640. On 28 April 1646, Moulay Rashid's brother, Sultan Sidi Mohammed, was defeated during the battle of El Qa'a by the Dilaite Leader Mohammed al-Hajj. The Dilaite troops had moved forward to Sijilmasa and sacked the city. Aged 15, Moulay Rashid and his brothers witnessed the sack of Sijilmasa by Dilaite troops. An adult Moulay Rashid would blame his brother Sidi Mohammed to have failed in protecting the city and to have let their sacred city be sacked by Berber troops.

Rebellions against Sultan Sidi Mohammed 
After the death of his father Moulay Sharif in 1659, Sidi Mohammed was once again proclaimed sultan. Moulay Rashid disavowed to pledge allegiance to his older half-brother the sultan, and withdrew himself from court with his partisans. The latter were Qa'id Bargua Susi, who was black, Qa'id Bequal and Qa'id Tufer Arabs and some soldiers. Moulay Rashid headed to the Dra’a, a province of the Sultanate of Tafilalt, to establish himself there. Sidi Mohammed aiming at suppressing the rebellion at birth followed him to Dra’a with a cavalry and having found him, took Moulay Rashid hostage and his followers as well. His followers who had committed treason were paraded on mules with their hock cut off, Moulay Rashid meanwhile was imprisoned. However, Moulay Rashid found a way to escape prison and having done so, quickly went on assembling troops. He starting to fear that his open rebellion kept on, but for the second time, Sultan Sidi Mohammed defeated him and his troops and Moulay Rashid was imprisoned once again. This time he was imprisoned in a smaller cell and Sidi Mohammed forbade him on receiving any visits. Only the sultan's most loyal black servants were allowed inside Moulay Rashid's cell to bring him food and other things he might need.

Escape from Tafilalt 
Moulay Rashid was for a long time imprisoner in his cell. But cunning as he was, he managed to corrupt the black servant who was allowed to enter his cell to serve him food. It is by dint of flattery and promises that he succeeded to corrupt this loyal servant of his brother the sultan. Moulay Rashid having noticed that the door of the tower was carried by a small wall of brick, thought to exploit this construction flaw for his escape. He made the black servant swear to bring to following night two peaks to make an opening, as well as weapons and horses. The following night, the Black slave did not miss to bring the previously mentioned. Moulay Rashid worked on the wall from the inside, while the black servant worked on it from the outside and they soon managed to break the wall. Moulay Rashid escaped prison for a second time, and although the man had just helped him in this achievement, he killed him with two blows of scimitar on his collar. Moulay Rashid didn't think fit to trust a traitor to his master, even if he owed him his escape. Alone, he thoroughly escaped to centers of authority outside the Sultanate of Tafilalt. He first arrived in Toudga province (Temsena) whose Master was Sidi Mohammed ben Bou Beker, a marabout. Moulay Rashid remained there some time. He hid his identity and proposed his services to Bou Beker by pretending to be a soldier (ranker). The old man received him and judging him a man of merit, gave him various jobs. Moulay Rashid executed so well his tasks that they slowly became friends. But a day came where some Tafilalt people came to sell dates recognized him and went to great him as the brother of their sultan. However, the sons of Bou Beker having learnt who he was and suspecting him to have not came here disguised without an agenda resolved to kill him. They made Moulay Rashid fall in an ambush from which he managed to escape and took flight to Demnat. There, he tried to recruit followers but failed and after staying there a short time, went to the Dila'iya Zawiya for refuge. Moulay Rashid remained there long enough before he had to leave at the demand of the Dilaites. People tell the story that he was asked to leave by a fellow man of this zawiya as he feared Moulay Rashid would betray them. According to a tradition conserved among the Dilaites (members of the Dila'iya Zawiya), they foresaw that the destruction of their zawiya would be operated by Moulay Rashid. So he followed the counsel of the man who advised him and left the Dila'iya Zawiya for Azrou. Some time after staying in the mountain of Azrou he left for Fez where El Doraidi gave him great hospitality. This episode happened most likely in 1662-63. In Morocco the Dilaites power began to decline when Sultan Mohammed al-Hajj perished in 1661-62 (1072 AH). Following his death, El Doraidi who commanded a body of Dilaite troops rebelled with his tribe the Doraid and proclaimed himself Sultan of Fez. In 1662-63 (1073 AH), Abdallah ibn Mohammed al-Hajj tried to take back Fez but failed. Therefore, for Al Doraid to have had been the one to extend his hospitality to Moulay Rashid these events should have previously happened. Moulay Rashid went to Fez with a small escort. He spent the night outside of Fez el Jedid and the following day he went for Taza.

In Taza he reached the end of his peregrination, as unlike his previous destinations he would stay around the Taza region longer and begin his quest for power from this point onward. Taza was a city right outside the northern border of the Sultanate of Tafilalt. The 'Alawi northern territory extended from the Moulouya River and included the city Oujda its surrounding oriental Rif and territories until the Tafna River. Their northern borders were mostly populated by Maqil Arabs and Beni Snassen.

Moulay Rashid remained around Taza, in the oriental Rif, for some time until 1664, his journey there was the springboard that allowed him to rise to power. Concerning the latter, the majority of historians only explain the outcome of his peregrinations around Taza, which was his auto-proclamation as sultan in 1664. For instance, Moroccan historians (al-Ifrani and al-Nasiri mainly) re-count only scarcely his adventures after he attains Taza and focus exclusively on the events after his auto-proclamation as sovereign. Solely records from Germain Mouette relate in all details his peregrinations before his auto-proclamation as sultan.

Rise to power 
At the end of his peregrinations, near Taza, according to Germain Mouette's biography of Moulay Rashid, the concerned sought, just like he did in Toudga, to offer his services to a prominent man. He offered his services to Ali Soliman the sheikh of Quiviane (Rif region). Ali Soliman was the Governor of Quiviane and received Moulay Rashid in his services. First, Ali gave him the charge of his palace. But soon enough, as Moulay Rashid entered in the good graces of his master, coupled with the fact that Ali was convinced of his merit, he consequently discharged upon. 

Moulay Rashid all the care of governing. In fact, Ali made Moulay Rashid his Chief House Stewart, he gave him the charge of his finances and made him his Chief Justice Secretary. Moulay Rashid performed his tasks with equity and justice and the people too, soon came to hold him in great esteem. He did good to everyone and defended the orphans and widows. People praised him for his righteousness, but Moulay Rashid gave glory of everything he did to his master. This behavior of him made Ali Soliman esteem him even more and entrust himself in his person further more. Ali Soliman gave Moulay Rashid the command of some of his troops and tasked him to calm muddles in his territories. With this last nomination, he thus reached his peak as he became Ali Soliman's lieutenant. Appearances can be deceiving as Moulay Rashid's goal was never to serve Ali Soliman, but rather for the people to esteem him so much that he would have no difficulty making them ally to his cause when he would betray their Master and seize his dominion. He sought to start by securing some fortresses of the country and the Citadel Dar Ibn Mich'al was his choice.

The Citadel Dar Ibn Mich'al 
In his translation of A history of the Alaouite dynasty by al-Zayani, Octave Houdas references Dar Ibn Mich'al as a castle identified as Dar Sheikh Chaoui by Renou. He completed his reference by citing that Haroun Ibn Mich'al, the castellan, was an extremely rich Jew who exerted a great influence over the populations in the surroundings of his palace. The earliest accounts of Ibn Mich'al are from the Beni Snassen. They account that Ibn Mich'al established himself among them in their territory and lived in a fortress on one of their mountains, also, that they lived under his protection. We can therefore locate this fortress Moulay Rashid tried to secure for himself in Snassen hill-country.

A version of the event from Germain Mouette claims that Moulay Rashid, lieutenant to Ali Soliman wanted to take possession of the citadel he had already located. Accompanied by his men and under the cover of conducting his duties as lieutenant to Ali Soliman, he pretexted a visit to the governor of this secluded fortress. Once inside, Moulay Rashid assaulted the citadel with his men, and made the governor die in torment to make him confess where he hid his treasures. He took away from a Jew who had dominated local trade (most likely Haroun Ibn Mich’al or Joseph Ben-Simon) and who lived in the very same castle the value of almost one million French livres (two hundred thousand metecals, former Moroccan currency) of his riches. Following the capture of the citadel, he distributed some of these plundered riches among his followers to boost their loyalty.

The assault on the citadel and the gain looted property was a decisive factor in equipping the army of Moulay Rashid with the means to assert his power. Sources differ on whether after securing this citadel he had already proclaimed himself sultan or he thought to take over Ali Soliman's dominions first as he had few followers who could only operate in small scales for guerrilla. In fact, historians state that he was rather proclaimed Mukadam (General in English) by his men and by Sheikh Al-Lawati leader of his Gharb (East in English) tribe.

The Great Warlord 
Moulay Rashid planned to overthrow Ali Soliman from his dominions. Having been made aware of Moulay Rashid's rebellious achievement Ali Soliman gathered an army of 7000 men and marched against Moulay Rashid before he could grow more powerful. Moulay Rashid's spies informed him that Ali Soliman was close to his position, so to gain advantage of position against him, he marched towards Ali Soliman and took camp on a plain. Moulay Rashid's troops were composed of 1500 infantry men and 600 horsemen well paid and motivated by it. That, in contrast with Ali Soliman's troops, even though outnumbering Moulay Rashid's ranks were poorly motivated, deprived from regular pay and with the resolve of flipping sides to the enemy. Moulay Rashid knowing himself outnumbered exploited this weakness in Ali Soliman's troops. Before the battle, when their troops were camping one day away from each other, Moulay Rashid sent some of his men to discreetly tell his praises and his pay liberalities in the other camp to encourage them to desert to his camp. This strategy succeeded as some of Ali Soliman's men deserted to Moulay Rashid's camp before the battle. However, it did not close the gap of his opponent's numeric superiority. Ali Soliman thought to quickly engage the battle before the majority of his troops would follow the footsteps of their comrades and desert him. Moulay Rashid accepted the offer.

During the battle, Moulay Rashid's men fought vigorously for his cause as even outnumbered, they held their positions. Ali Soliman's troops during the fighting, started to defect him for Moulay Rashid whose party was stronger. Seeing that the odds were against him, Ali tried to escape the battlefield, but his men who had just defected him captured him and brought him to Moulay Rashid, the winner. Back in his camp victorious, Moulay Rashid gave Ali Soliman an ultimatum: he would spear his life if he relinquishes his riches to him, he argued that reason implied him to relinquish them as they were of no use to him any longer. Would he reject this offer, he would suffer a shameful death. Weak and defeated by his once servant, Ali Soliman ceded to the ultimatum. However, back in Quiviane when Ali showed him his riches, Moulay Rashid doubted his honesty and believed he did not show him the full extent of his fortune. Despite Ali Soliman protesting his honesty Moulay Rashid put him to death. Upon executing him, he was quoted to have declared to his followers: ".. A Prince who buries them (riches) in the ground do not deserve to reign; come, my friends, let us share what your pains and affection for myself made you deserve." He kept the gold for himself and gave all silver to his officers for sharing with the soldiers.

This last episode of Moulay Rashid's peregrinations happened in 1664, right before he proclaimed himself sultan. In fact, according to both Moroccan historians whose accounts bypass the details of his peregrinations around Taza and Germain Mouette's who detail the latter, Moulay Rashid auto-proclaimed himself sovereign in the Oriental Rif Region. He did so in Quiviane on the spoils of war won from Ali Soliman. Consequently, he was sworn oath of fidelity by his followers who were mainly Maqil Arabs and the Beni Snassen.

The Battle of Angad 
Moulay Rashid following his auto-proclamation as sultan established himself in Oujda. Sultan Sidi Mohammed who has been peacefully reigning the Sultanate of Tafilalt was made aware of his brother's rebellious achievement in his northern border. It was Sidi Mohammed who journeyed North to meet Moulay Rashid on the battlefield. He wanted to prevent an immediate attack from his bellicose and strengthened brother on Sijilmasa. The battle took place on August 2, 1664. Historical source do not extensively detail the battle of Angad.

Before his victory over Ali Soliman, Moulay Rashid had 600 cavalrymen armed with lances, followed by 1500 infantry men armed with rifles and bows and arrows. After Ali Soliman's defeat, 7000 of his troops defected to Moulay Rashid. The numbers of the casualties suffered on both camps were not cited but the remainder of Ali Soliman's men all defected to Moulay Rashid. His ranks were now composed of 2,100 cavalrymen and 8,000 infantry men. In addition to that, following his capture of the citadel of Dar Ibn Mich’al he amassed riches that allowed him to supply a regular army.

His opponent Sidi Mohammed of Tafilalt came to battle him with 5000 cavalrymen and 9000 infantrymen. Moulay Rashid's disadvantage was obvious as his brother's troops outnumbered his. However, Moulay Rashid's troops were highly motivated as composed exclusively of voluntary elite troops who made the sermon to defend their newly proclaimed sultan as he was a man they believed in. To show his esteem, following their oath, Moulay Rashid granted them liberalities in terms of pay.

Made aware that his elder brother journeying North to campaign against him, with his men's sermon Moulay Rashid in turn marched to meet him on the battlefield. Aware of him being outnumbered he thought to use the terrain to his advantage. Through the mountains, he found a strategic point for him to camp in. He camped in the mountains to protect his outnumbered troops as the mountains were natural fortifications which prevented mass cavalry charge. The rivalling brothers were now just days apart of each other and the battle was imminent.

The battle of Angad took place on the 2nd of August 1664 (H: Friday 9th Muharram 1075) on the eponymous Angad Plain. The Angad plain is an arid plateau located south of the Mont of the Beni Snassen (Oriental Rif). While Mouette tell the tale of two battles and a siege between Moulay Rashid and Sidi Mohammed, most historians agree that the battle of Angad was the unexpected victory that brought Moulay Rashid on the throne of Tafilalet. Mouette might have confused Sidi Mohammed with his son Sidi Mohammed Saghir (the younger in English) who tried to succeed his father during the siege of Sijilmasa.

The two rivaling brothers were now witnessing the premises of the battle which was soon to take place on the Plain of Angad, where Moulay Rashid went to meet his brother on the frontline. Sidi Mohammed was forecasting to capture his brother alive upon defeating him. However, fate decided otherwise as barely the battle started that Sidi Mohammed received a bullet in the neck, he immediately succumbed to his injury. Deprived of their leader, Sidi Mohammed's men lacked guidance and thus were routed by Moulay Rashid's men and then killed. Some were made prisoners. The battle of Angad was a unanimous victory for Moulay Rashid. At the end of the battle, Moulay Rashid found his brother's body, he was saddened by the death of his brother and mourned him. He himself washed his brother's corps (ghusl ritual) during the funerals and transported it to the citadel Dar Ibn Mich'al for burial.

Aftermaths of the Battle of Angad 
Back at the citadel Dar Ibn Mich’al, he buried his brother in it. With Sidi Mohammed deceased, his men went to enlarge the ranks of Moulay Rashid's army and turned their allegiance to him. Moulay Rashid found himself at the head of considerable forces. His first move as the de facto Sultan of Tafilalt was to send emissaries to nearby tribes for them to swear allegiance to him in Oujda. Also, Moulay Rashid inscribed his deceased brother's former troops on the guish registers (army registers) and provided them with clothes, weapons and horses. Such growing forces required greater finances that he lacked after having spent his gained riches on various military matters during the previous period.

On the latter, as a reminder, the day Ibn Mich’al was killed Moulay Rashid took his son with him. His mother came to Oujda to ask for her son given back to her. Moulay Rashid used procrastination towards her until a day he told her that he would give her son back to her, only if she would reveal him where are hidden her deceased husband's riches. The mother ceded to his demand and he went with her at the Kasbah where she showed him a cabinet in a room. He fractured it and found there jars full of gold and silver. He took away those riches which improved his position and used them also as means of payment for his troops. Moulay Rashid finances were getting better and his men's situation was improving, which occurrence he considered a sign of good omen.

Now the de facto Sultan of Tafilalt, and having strengthened the basis of his new army, he aimed at achieving the goal his deceased brother Sidi Mohamed almost accomplished, conquering Al Maghrib (Morocco in Arabic).

He began by sending emissaries to the Western Rif (Westward from Oujda), and thus camped on the banks of the Moulouya river waiting for new followers returning with his emissaries. But as no one came he marched on Taza, the penultimate step before Fez, one of the traditional capitals of Morocco.

After a fierce battle he managed to seize Taza. The dwellers of the fallen city swore allegiance to him, as well as the tribes which surrounded the city. When the Fassi heard of the capture of Taza by Moulay Rashid, they united with their neighboring tribes the Hayaina, the Bahlil and the Sefrou people and took the oath to battle him and not to swear allegiance to him. The Fassi wanted to prevent their doom as the Hayaina were massacred by his brother Sidi Mohamed back in 1663. At the same time, the Masters of every neighborhood in Fez prescribed their dwellers to buy horses and weapons. Every house had to be equipped with a rifle or suffer punishment. Soon enough, more than enough rifles were brought. At Bab Ftouh took place the review of the prescribed war material, they pledged to fight Moulay Rashid on the battlefield.

Moulay Rashid was made aware of Fez's war preparations. Nonetheless, he put his plans for Fez on hold for the time being. And instead, prioritized Sijilmasa. He went back home to battle Sidi Mohammed ’s eldest son who claimed the throne of Tafilalt for himself.

Siege of Sijilmasa 
Sidi Mohammed Saghir, eldest son of the deceased Sultan Sidi Mohammed, ruled the sultanate after news of his father's death. However, due to his father's troops defecting to Moulay Rashid he was left with poor resources to battle the fortified party of his uncle. Moulay Rashid wanting to avoid a bloodbath back home chose to siege Sijilmasa rather that assaulting it. Had he have chosen the later, he would have become very unpopular among the leaders of the Filali and the ksour (qsur) towns. Upon besieging Sijilmasa for 9 months, devastated by the siege, Sidi Mohammed Saghir took flight at night.

Victorious, in 1665 Moulay Rashid entered Sijilmasa, without bloodshed. He unanimously received oath of fidelity from the leaders of the Filali, the shurafa and the ksour towns and was officially proclaimed Sultan of Tafilalt. He put the other sons of Sidi Mohammed under the supervision of Moulay Aran his elder half-brother to date and full brother of Sidi Mohammed. He prioritized the tasks of restoring the city's ramparts, organizing the guard services and calming the region. After achieving so, he named Moulay Aran Khalifa (Viceroy in English) of Sijilmasa and went back to Taza to prepare his military campaign for Fez.

In the 1660s Morocco's political climate was tense. Since 1659, The putschist Abdul Karim Abu Bakr Al-Shabani, who assassinated his nephew the last Saadi sultan Ahmad al-Abbas, proclaimed himself sultan of lower Morocco by seizing the Saadi dynasty's initial capital of Marrakesh. However, viewed a usurper, he only ruled over the city and never received the Bay'ah from the people. General Khadir Ghaïlan controlled Western Rif (Hebt region and Qsar Katama), and clashed in 1660 with the Dilaite sultan Mohammed al-Hajj for definition of rural territories. He lost the battle but inflicted considerable casualties to the Dilaites. This, coupled with the death of Sultan Mohammed al-Hajj the following year, in 1661, prompted the Dilaites rapid decline. Moreover, the straw that broke the camel was indisputably Caid Al Doraidi's revolt in Fez, then, capital of the Dilaite State and his auto-proclamation as Sultan of Fez.

Abdallah Al Doraidi however, was solely officially recognized as Master of the Fez Confederation and so, only in time of truce between Fes Jdid and Fes el Bali. Indeed, he never received the Bay'ah, oath sworn to a sultan, from the ulama of Fes el Bali as the man wasn't viewed eligible for the position. Al Doraidi, as Master of the Fez Confederation ruled Fes Jdid and had the support of the Andalus quarter within Fes el Bali. Back then, Fez consisted of two walled cities: Fes Jdid ('New Fes' in Arabic) and Fes el Bali ('Old Fes' in Arabic). Fes el Bali comprised two neighborhoods, Al Qarawiyyin and Al Andalus, divided in two by the Fes River. The Sultanate of Tafilalt and all the existing other factions were fighting for the throne of Morocco.

Campaigns for Fez 
In the Spring of 1665, Sultan Moulay Rashid of Tafilalt moved in the direction of Fez by establishing a military base at Taza. As soon as the Fassi heard of that, along with their allies the Hayaina, they marched there as well. Their goal was to defeat Moulay Rashid and weaken him to a point where he could no longer launch a military campaign on Fez. In April 1665, the Fassi militias and Hayaina levies marched out of Fez to fight Moulay Rashid in Taza, he was ready to meet them on the battleground. But they had barely just arrived in presence of his mhalla (army division) that discord having arisen between them, they were routed and pursued until the Sebou River near Fez where they surrendered. Moulay Rashid went back on his paces to Taza. After their disgraceful defeat, Fez and their allies the Hayaina pleaded for peace but negotiations failed and Moulay Rashid kept on going his campaign for Fez.

In August 1665, Moulay Rashid launched his offensive on Fez by putting camp at its gates and besieging the city. However, after 3 days of fighting, as Fez kept resisting to the offensive at its walls, he chose to retreat. In the midst of his pull out, a bullet hit him on his earlobe but he managed to safely retreat. Moulay Rashid after his previous unbothered victory on fields had planned a quick offensive, but did not reckon Fez's strong defenses against siege weapons. Historic sources do not precise whether he lifted the siege too at the same time of his retreat. One of his General might have been left behind to carry the ongoing siege. Especially when Germain Mouette precise that Moulay Rashid sieged Fez for 11 months. In September 1665, Moulay Rashid came back and besieged Fez for a second time. He put camp on the city's walls and fierce fighting followed. Fires and fighting caused ravages once again. After having killed and pillaged, Moulay Rashid of Tafilalt lifted the siege for a second time and doubled back to Taza. Once back in Taza, after his inconclusive campaign on Fez, he put it on hold once again and turned back to another alarming direction, the Rif.

Moulay Rashid chose to concentrate his efforts on the central Rif, to destroy the A'aras clan's influence there. This clan was seated around Al Hoceima and was led by Abou Mohammed Abdallah A'aras. The latter had links of friendship with European powers who were inclined to trade with the Riffians in wax and provisions. This was the case for the Spanish settled in the Fortress enclave of Peñón de Vélez de la Gomera. Likewise for the French who, since 1655–1657, had entered into talks with Abou Mohammed Abdallah A'aras for the establishment of a French comptoir on the islets situated on Mersat el-Moudjahadin (The Bay of the fighters of the Faith) and Chafarinas Islands. Cardinal Mazarin, the initiator, was willing to put 100 thousand French livre for the realization of these establishments. For the French this was an important enterprise as the Franco-Spanish War (1635–1659) prompted their merchant ships to anchor on Moroccan coasts. During this period, Moulay Rashid of Tafilalt had banned trade with European powers. According to Patricia Ann Mercer, "Al-Rashid is known to have laid a veto upon the formerly free and open Muslim provisioning of the Christian enclaves at the edge of his sphere of influence." The A'aras clan leader Abou Mohammed Abdallah A'aras factually revolted against this veto, Moulay Rashid meant to clash with him.

After having localized his opponent, Moulay Rashid marched against him. However, the insurgent Abou Mohammed Abdallah A'aras who did not have enough troops to fight took flight to Peñón de Vélez de la Gomera with his family, along with his belongings. There, he put himself under the Spanish King's protection while leaving a son, Abdelaziz, to carry the burden of fighting Moulay Rashid. Skirmishes took place, however, historic sources are not clear on whether it was Abdelaziz or his father that Moulay Rashid was fighting. Nevertheless, in March 1666, during the month of Ramadan, after a number of encounters and fights the A'aras were defeated on their territory. Abdelaziz was made prisoner, manacled and taken to Taza. There, he swore allegiance to Sultan Moulay Rashid who consequently speared his life and pardoned him. The A'aras clan was sent in exile to Peñón de Vélez de la Gomera. This last move concluded the Rif interlude during his ongoing siege on Fez.

Amidst the already globally tense political climate in Morocco, since 1659, anarchy reigned in Fez. Friction and fighting were common between Fes Jdid and Fes el Bali, and the Mellah of Fez suffered oppression under Caid Abdallah Al Doraidi's rule. The latter ruled Fes Jdid and was Master of the Fez confederation but solely in times of truce between the two waring cities. Caid Al Doraidi was formerly registered on the Diwan (Court) of the Saadi princes along with his tribe. He was part of the troops of Mohammed al-Hajj when the latter was proclaimed sultan by the Fassi following the murder of the last Saadi Sultan Ahmad al-Abbas in 1659. But when the Dilaites started to struggle in the North-west against Khadir Ghaïlan, he betrayed them and seized power by an uprising in Fes Jdid. As ruler, Al Doraidi had the support of the Andalus district in Fes el Bali. Indeed, he had links of friendship with the Master of 'Uduat Al Andalus Ahmed ben Salah whose son, Salah ben Ahmed, had wedded his daughter. In Fes el Bali, the Leader of the Qarawiyyin neighborhood was Ibn Esseghir, the Master of the Lemthiens. While the Leader of the Andalus neighborhood was Ahmed ben Salah. The two Leaders were in open conflict with each other.

Moulay Rashid at the end of the month of Mai 1666, for the third time, laid siege on Fez. Germain Mouette stated that Moulay Rashid initially went with 1000 cavalrymen at Fes el Bali's gates, laid camp there and urged the Fassi to surrender. The dwellers who had come out and bordered their ramparts argued that if he wanted to be their Master he should seize Fes Jdid as she commanded them and tired them a lot. Germain Mouette's narration of events do collude with the one of Moroccan sources, only the order of occurrence of the events differs.

This third time however, Moulay Rashid came with his whole army and besieged Fez from Fes Jdid walls. The battle for Fez started, the two armies clashed in full power but Moulay Rashid's party was not making any fatal blows to the besieged. As a matter of fact, Caid Abdallah Al Doraidi (named deformed to de ringuy), who commanded in person the defense of Fez, resisted vigorously to Moulay Rashid's assault. Many skirmishes occurred from either sides, and day after day Fez kept holding the upper hand as Moulay Rashid's army was wasting away without him being able to crush his opponent in any way. Now convinced he would not be able to capture Fez with a frontal assault, another strategy was thought.

Capture of Fez 
Despite having brought his whole army for his third siege of Fez, Moulay Rashid could not enter Fez who was staunchly defended by Caid Abdallah Al Doraidi. He therefore thought of a scenario in which his men could somehow enter the city and take Fez from its inner walls. With the help of the Jewish community of Taza, contact was established with the Jews of the Mellah of Fez who accepted to collude with Al-Rashid's party.

The Mellah of Fez is situated between Fes Jdid and Fes el Bali. Since the fall of the Saadi Sultanate in 1659, the Jewish neighborhood in the capital of Fez have suffered steady persecution at both the hand of the Dilaites and under Caid Al Doraidi's rule. In fact, the Dilaites ordered destruction of synagogues in their Mellah. And after them, Caid Al Doraidi relentlessly demanded the Mellah of Fez heavy contributions. In addition, the anarchy that came following Al Doraidi's coup d'état caused the Mellah of Fez's traffic between the two warring cities to be pillaged by Al Doraidi and ultimately reach a state of total interruption. They turned to emigration as hunger stoke their community and since a change in their Leader's policies towards them was no longer to contemplate. The Mellah of Fez surnamed Al Doraidi "the persecutor" and they certainly did not contemplate a Dilaite comeback after their initial plight in their hands. But now allied to Al-Rashid, important dealings happened in which he promised them that if they would help him in his conquest of Fez, he would alleviate the traditional Jizya poll tax on their community, and also promised the Jewish community peace.

Amidst the ongoing siege of Fez, the Jews of the Mellah told Al-Rashid the day and hour they would give him entry in Fez. The day they indicated him was the 3rd of Dhu al-Hijjah 1076 (in Hijri calendar), being June 6, 1666. This day, by night, Al-Rashid with his elite troops ambushed Fez's defenders. The ambush took place in the gardens near the Mellah of Fez's walls and was probably meant as a distraction for the entry Gate's watch. The Jews recognized the signal on which they agreed, and subsequently went to take hold of their Gate. They opened their Gate and thus let Moulay Rashid to enter Fez.

Having entered Fez this night of June 6, 1666, he reached the Mellah of Fez and diligently took possession of the city's first inner gate and its first inner wall. Moulay Rashid brought in all his troops and along with his infantry, he smashed the second Gates with an ax. The surprise was absolute and he entered victorious in Fes Jdid. Caid Abdallah Al Doraidi who thought nothing less than that, having learned that Moulay Rashid had taken possession of Fez's inner Gates and that his troops surrounded the first wall, took flight by the Gate called Bab es-Sabaa (nowadays Bab Dekkakin). Moulay Rashid informed of his escape had put 100 cavalrymen after him who reached him without difficulty and brought him back to their sultan. Facing Al Doraidi, Moulay Rashid asked him where he hid his riches. But as the man was turning a deaf ear to his demand, Moulay Rashid used confessing torture specially set for him on which Al Doraidi languished on many days.

The following day, June 7, he attacked Fes el Bali and besieged it. most chronicles, support that Ibn Esseghir and his son fled Fes el Bali from Bab Guissa. And two days later, it was Ahmed ben Saleh who in turn fled. Their leaders having deserted them, the dwellers, judging themselves too weak to resist, and seeing division arising amongst themselves, left the city and went to swear oath of fidelity to Moulay Rashid whom they unanimously proclaimed sovereign.

Moulay Rashid immediately sent troops to look for the runaway Masters. Ben Salah who fled the last was found in the city's suburbs. He was captured and sent to prison in Fes Jdid at the Gate of Dar Ben Chegra. Some of his followers were put to death. Ibn Esseghir and his son were in turn found in Hayaina territories, they were captured and sent to the same prison of Ben Salah. On Moulay Rashid's orders, they were all executed a week later.

Reign

Sultan of Fez 
Following his conquest of Fez on June 6, 1666, Moulay Rashid of Tafilalt officially became Sultan of Morocco upon receiving the Bay'ah from the ulama of Fez and the inhabitants. The ceremony took place before noon, according to Mohammed al-Ifrani:

After his Bay'ah ceremony, he married a daughter of Sheikh Al-Lawati, his longtime supporter. He gave the charge of the royal palace to his new father-in-law and gifted him a sublime palace in Fes el Bali for his use. Moulay Rashid entrusted him also to calm his furor when anger would get to rule himself onto his subjects. Sheikh Al-Lawati would not miss, in the future, to carry out that entrusted responsibility. Following this wedding, the Al-Lawati family would benefit from the favor of the sultan, as he went further to give governing positions to some of Sheikh Al-Lawati's capable sons.

In Autumn 1666, he sent for the auto-exiled Abdallah A'aras, who was in Peñón de Vélez de la Gomera, through his imprisoned son Abdelaziz. Moulay Rashid tasked the latter to urge his father to come back home from his refuge, and that he would be welcomed in Court as one of his esteemed friends. The act was political, as although having conquered Central Rif, symbolism resided in the person of Abdallah A'aras, whose tribe was exiled from their dominions. Now sultan of Morocco, there was no motive to keep animosity on these fallen people, whose rallying on his side meant that he would hold two third of the whole Northern coast of Morocco. It is said that Abdelaziz executed so well his task in urging his father that Moulay Rashid grateful, freed him and made him Al Caid (Major in Arabic) with 200 horsemen for guards. Abdallah A'aras upon receiving the letter shed tears of joy, as he thought his son dead. The old man, learning of the good treatment his son Abdelaziz was receiving from Moulay Rashid, sent the latter his most beautiful daughter for him to wed. Moulay Rashid, having had notice of Abdallah A'aras' daughter arrival, accepted the wedding proposal. She was escorted by a large suite with gifts loaded on camels. He subsequently ordered her brother Abdelaziz to go meet his sister with his cavalry, so that she was treated and received as a queen. The future bride and groom met a day away from Fez where they stayed awaiting his future father-in-law. Upon the latter's arrival, after a warm welcome, Moulay Rashid restored him on his dominions in central Rif and ordered back from exile his tribe, the A'aras. The sultan pressed his desire to keep his new brothers-in-law by his side for future key positions, the grateful Abdallah A'aras insisted the glory of his family resided in him remaining in Court, and that he wished so for his remaining days. Moulay Rashid gave his second father-in-law a beautiful palace in Fes el Bali for residence. Back in Fez, Moulay Rashid's second nuptials to the daughter of Abdallah A'aras took place with great fanfare. In a mark of generosity, he pardoned prisoners in all the cities of his kingdom, which according to Germain Mouette, did not contribute little to put him in the esteem of his people.

His second nuptials just over, in October 1666, that took place the surrender of Meknes. A deputation from this city came to Moulay Rashid in Fez and expressed their will to be part of his realm. He accepted their allegiance. Moulay Rashid gave this city as personal appanage to his younger half-brother Moulay Ismail and at the same time, made him Khalifa (Viceroy) of Meknes. After this episode, he led off preparations for his new military campaign in the Rif. In this enterprise, he sent for his nephews, the sons of the late Muhammad ibn Sharif and Moulay Mehrez (his older half-brother). The sons of Sidi Mohammed made excuse for the trip and thereby only his nephews, sons of Moulay Mehrez responded and made the trip to Fez, where they were warmly welcomed. Moulay Ahmed ben Mehrez, the oldest of his nephews who was in his mid-teens would accompany Moulay Rashid in his expected future conquests. Meanwhile, the sons of the late Muhammad ibn Sharif fearing their absence would be received as an affront, took refuge in the Mountains. Before departing, he tasked a group of rich merchants of Fez to each rebuild a house in Fes Jdid who suffered damage from the past warring period. At his return they would serve as lodging for his soldiers. At last, he named Si Hamdoun Elmezouâr Qadi of Fez before departing in campaign against General Khadir Ghaïlan, the Master Western Rif.

Sultan Moulay Rashid's war preparations over, he had assembled an army composed of 8000 cavalrymen, 32 000 infantrymen for his campaign to conquer the Western Rif provinces. His enemy's dominions included the territories between Ksar el-Kebir, Tétouan and Ma'amora (present-day Mehdya). Moulay Rashid marched to Ksar el-Kebir the homebase of Ghaïlan. The latter, who was not short in displaying courage, upon learning of Moulay Rashid's arrival marched against him with an army of 20 000 men. In fact, even outnumbered, Ghaïlan was confident in victory as his men were veterans accustomed to fight the Christians at their shores. However, on the latter, he might have overlooked his men's moral.

The battle took place near Ksar el-Kebir by its southern road, Ghaïlan arranged his troops in battalion as he was accustomed to do, a method he kept from constantly fighting European powers. The two armies arrived in a short time in sight of each other's camps, it was Moulay Rashid who launched the assault, while Ghaïlan's ranks were on the defensive. The Riffian's party withstood the chock with incredible vigor. During the course of the action, General Ghaïlan exhorted his men to defend their homeland against their enemy and kept motivating them by way of speech. Ghaïlan was eager to catch sight of Moulay Rashid, he wanted to fight him in a one-on-one duel. However, upon five whole hours of fierce fighting, as he kept watching the horizon, it wasn't Moulay Rashid he could perceive, but his men defecting to his enemy. As previously mentioned, Ghaïlan fatally overlooked his men's moral. At the beginning his men held with determination their defensive position, but as outnumbered launching offensives required a steady level of motivation, which they reasonably lacked during this battle. Indeed, politically speaking, their countrymen of central Rif had already sworn allegiance to Moulay Rashid with the former Chief of Central Rif Abdallah A'aras restored, and his daughter married to the sultan. Therefore, a foe he was not for them, thus it led them to defect to Moulay Rashid's party as Ghaïlan's slogan of defending one's homeland against one's enemy was erroneous with the previous alliance of the A'aras to the 'Alawi Crown.

Upon Ghaïlan's men defecting to their opponent, victory for Moulay Rashid was secured. The defeated fled to Asilah, where Moulay Rashid's men pursued him. Ghaïlan locked himself in this fortified port and remained refuged there some time before finally departing for Algiers in Ottoman Algeria where he had sent there his family and belongings. The cities of Tétouan, Ksar el-Kebir and Salé swore allegiance to Moulay Rashid. He remained some time in Western Rif operation money raises as means of payment for his men. Moulay Rashid availed from the mediation of sheikhs from Salé to secretly pass gifts to influent sheikhs of the Dila'iya Zawiya. This was the first tactical move signaling his aiming upon the zawiya, divide and rule was his strategy, thus gaining influent partisans. The Western Rif campaign over, he returned to Fez.

Conquest of the Dila'iya Zawiya 
As sultan in Fez, Moulay Rashid was determined to end the rule of the Dilaites, a Berber movement which ruled, at its might the northern part of Morocco but started to decline following the death of Sultan Mohammed al-Hajj in 1661. Their territories were consequently reduced to the Middle Atlas and the western plains comprising territories from: the south of Rabat to Azemmour. The Dilaites became great foes to the 'Alawis, during the previous reign of Muhammad ibn Sharif, when they sacked Sijilmasa the pelvis of sharifs, after their victory at the battle of El Qa’a in 1646.

In 1667, the influent sheikhs of the Dila'iya Zawiya whom Moulay Rashid targeted for bribery, accepted to secretly side with him, and thus betrayed Abdallah ibn Mohammed al-Hajj, leader of the Dila'iya Zawiya. The latter, having been made aware of Moulay Rashid's plans to conquer his dominions, gathered all of the brotherhood at Dila, and accounting for his peaceful rule and good treatment of them argued that reason implied them to fight their enemy and destroy it. He implored them to remain loyal as they were for the past forty years, and swore to be grateful for it. Following his sermon, his followers, along with the corrupted sheikhs, swore to fight their enemy and not to desert him.

As per historic accounts, Moulay Rashid's conquest of Dila did not occur after one decisive show-down, but rather was preceded by multiple encounters before the final campaign on Dila. The two opposing parties prepared for their certain future confrontation in very different styles.

The Alawis' defeat at El Qa’a back in 1646 still resonated in Moulay Rashid's mind. It is a fact that the Amazigh are fierce warriors, their hegemony is renown to be on the battlefield where frank contest is no intimidation for them. Thus, Moulay Rashid was determined to learn from his predecessor's defeat and to put all cards on his side, he sought to offset this by acting on the political side. His action was early as stated previously, upon finishing his campaign of western Rif, as by early 1667 some sheikhs of the zawiya were successfully corrupted. Their rallying to his side was most likely what made the winds turn on his side, more than anything else. Naturally Moulay Rashid would use this master card only on last recourse.

Sometime between late 1666 and early 1667, Moulay Rashid made a military run in the outskirts of Meknes against the Ait Ouallal, as they supported the Dilaites. He defeated and raided them, before they could make any impact on the city's rural environment. He went back to Fez, but barely back that Abdallah ibn Mohammed al-Hajj made a military run, departing his mountains, he came to camp with his armies at Bou Zmoura near the Fes River (tributary of the Sebou River). The enemy was in Fez's neighborhood, Moulay Rashid went to meet him on the battleground and the fighting began. It lasted three days and the battle ended in the retreat of Abdallah ibn Mohammed al-Hajj, defeated.

After this second victory against the Dilaites, Moulay Rashid for the next period, between January 7 (11 Rajab 1077) and early August 1667 (Rabiʽ al-Awwal 1078) among other trips, notably achieved a military inspections in Taza and in Meknes the latter ending in the removal of El'aguîd as governor of Meknes. And also, inspections in Tétouan where he arrested Aboùl'abbâs Ahmed Enneqsîs, the head of the city, and notables from his party, he brought them back with him in Fez, where he condemned them all to perpetual prison.

According to Mouette, for war preparations, Abdallah ibn Mohammed al-Hajj charged his men to conduct levies, and commanded for part of these recruits to join their respective sheikhs and remain in the mountains, they would serve as additional troops in case he would need some more during the battle. The rest of the levies were sent to him at Dila.

In 1668 at Dila, once his troops assembled Abdallah ibn Mohammed al-Hajj reviewed the new war contingent and judging it more than sufficient to fight Moulay Rashid he granted some liberalities to his soldiers and commanded them to obey inviolably whatever their superiors would order them. His war preparations over he left Dila, with the intention of waiting for Moulay Rashid's arrival to fight him. The battle was imminent now as Ibn Mohammed al-Hajj signaled by his last move his readiness to engage the battle for Dila.

Moulay Rashid's grand scheme in collusion with some Sheikhs of the Zawiya was yet to be uncovered. Those sheikhs were given infantry troops to command by Ibn Mohammed al-Hajj who remained unaware of their treason.

In 1668, before departing for his military expedition against the Dila'iya Zawiya, Moulay Rashid appointed the juristconsult Mohammed ben Ahmed El Fassi as mufti and governor of Fez. For Moulay Rashid, crushing the Zaouia of Dila was of paramount importance, not only did they hold political power but they retained among the Fassi urban elite a high level of religious prestige. Therefore, the manner of achieving his conquest was a delicate task as: a military power they were indeed; and most importantly Moulay Rashid wanted to avoid the manufacture of martyrs. This justified his choice of Mohammed Al Fassi as governor in Fez during his absence since Al Fassi was a faqīh of Fez's most noted religious community, the Zawiya al-Fassiya. Indeed, at the time in 1668, considering the amount of political tensions from the previous two decades, members of Fez's urban Zawiya al-Fassiya ended up looking upon the rural Dila'iya Zawiya with more rivalry than brotherhood.

At that time, according to Mouette the corrupted sheikhs were instructed to corrupt their assigned rankers by dint of flattering eulogy to make them believe Moulay Rashid would be a better ruler and would grant them great pay liberalities if they side with him and be the reason of his victory. After that, they sent an express to Moulay Rashid giving opinion that everything would turn out in his favor and urged for him to quickly engage combat with Ibn Mohammed al-Hajj, stating their fear that their maneuver in his favor would be ruined with time passing and soldiers turning sides again to their original Master, guilty of their treason.

On April 24, 1668, Moulay Rashid left Fez for the expedition to conquer the Dila'iya Zawiya. Arriving in Dila'iya territory, he marched against the contingent of Berbers in Jbelzebibe and Benzeroel. Those of Jebelzebibe after several skirmishes in mountain defiles were defeated, they put themselves under his obedience. Then, Moulay Rashid advanced and went against the Sharif of Benzeroel nicknamed Moulay Benzeroel. The latter placed his soldiers in ambush on the avenues of his mountains to block entry way to Moulay Rashid. First, at his arrival, Moulay Benzeroel lined up his troops to give him the fight, Moulay Rashid was vigorously expelled three times with considerable loss of men. Without any orders his men started to retreat due to the overwhelming defense. Moulay Rashid was angry at the sight of his men disobeying him and retreat in this manner, and said:

Finishing these words, he gave first, head bowed, against his enemies, who redoubled on him a grid of pebbles and arrows capable of terrifying any other than him; but vigorously continuing his attack; he was so valiantly seconded by his own; that he forced this time the Berbers to find their salvation in flight. By this success, he became master of their camp. He subsequently detached some cavalry troops, which he sent by a mountain detour, to cut them off, whom killed more than four thousand of enemy in their flight.

Moulay Benzeroel seeing his troops defeated came to find Moulay Rashid, who received him as if there has been no battle between them. He called him his uncle, and told him that in his consideration he was going to put an end to the carnage of his people. After the loot of anything of valor in these mountains, Moulay Rashid asked the old man Moulay Benzeroel a part of his fortune, and not using the cruelty he displayed to others, he received what he was presented with. Furthermore, Moulay Rashid sent him as a friend, to finish the rest of his life in Fez. The Berbers of the conquered mountains Jbelzebibe and Benzeroel were compelled to pay the sultan heavy contributions. After this episode, he marched against Abdallah Ibn Mohammed al-Hajj, stationed further inside the Middle Atlas.

In Fezzaz, Moulay Rashid and his army arrived at sight of Ibn Mohammed al-Hajj in the middle of the countryside, resolutely waiting for him with army. His arrival for Ibn Mohammed al-Hajj clearly signaled the defeat of his armies at the foot of the mountains, now the long-awaited confrontation was going to take place.

But when the fighting had to begin, the traitors among Ibn Mohammed al-Hajj's ranks made him prisoner by seizing him. In the moment, those people thought of murdering him but they let him live for the sole reason of his reputation of being a Saint. He was captured and sent to Moulay Rashid frontline. Upon the capturing Abdallah Ibn Mohammed al-Hajj, his army was divided with a flank supporting Moulay Rashid and the other who had remained loyal but were deprived from leadership. The battle had taken an unpredicted turn in favor of Moulay Rashid. His victory was unanimous and he subsequently spared the lives of the Dilaite troops, refusing to wastefully spread the blood of Muslims. Ibn Mohammed al-Hajj was sent to Fez, spending some time there before departing with his family for exile in Tlemcen in February 1669. The sons of Ibn Mohammed al-Hajj, who had remained in the mountains, learning of the defeat of their father took a steady flight to Mecca. The capture of Dila' took place June 18, 1668 (8 of Muharram 1079 AH), Moulay Rashid had been victorious of the campaign without suffering great casualty. He forgave the inhabitants of Dila', furthermore, he inflicted no molestation on them and killed no one.

Victorious from his campaign against the Dilaites, he spent some time there where he received allegiance of the people populating the Middle Atlas. Before leaving, Moulay Rashid razed to the ground the building of the zawiya in Dila'. He erased all construction track so well that it became like a harvested field that one would have not believed inhabited the day before. The inhabitants who have been evacuated, were relocated along with its Jewish community to Fez.

Conquest of Marrakesh 
Since 1659, Marrakesh was ruled by the usurpers al-Shabani family, their rule was variously estimated by contemporary authors. European authors reported their rule as unpopular, while al-Ifrani attributed them a vague note of approval. In fact, European commentators report that the inhabitants of Marrakesh, remaining loyal to the memory of the Saadis, deemed them illegitimate rulers and never performed the Bay'ah to neither the father Abdul Karim nor to the son, Abu Bakr, and thus their influence was resumed to the sole city of Marrakesh. Abdul Karim al-Hajj ben Abu Bakr al-Shabani (nicknamed Kerroum al-Hajj), having no idea of administration, despised the Marrakshi to the point that he voluntarily discharged all of governing to his confidant who was abusive towards the dwellers. Since his father's murder in 1667 Abu Bakr was proclaimed sultan in Marrakesh, although here again the title sultan was not fully legitimate as solely the Chabanate tribe in Marrakesh proclaimed him such. Abu Bakr was in all a very ineffective ruler as he gave in to his passions and never bothered to effectively rule and organize his army. The latter thought of planning the defense of the city only when Moulay Rashid was at the gates to conquer Marrakesh.

However, according to al-Ifrani's version of the events, Having entered Marrakesh, Abdul Karim invited the population to take an oath of loyalty to him, which took place in the year 1069 (1659). He united under his authority the whole kingdom of Marrakesh and behaved in an admirable way with regard to his subjects. It was under his reign that the so-called great famine of the year H.1070 took place (B.C. September 18, 1659 – September 6, 1660). Abdul Karim remained proudly seated on the throne of Marrakesh until the time of his death shortly before Moulay Rashid conquered Marrakesh. On the death of Kerroum al-Hajj, his son Abu Bakr succeeded him as ruler in Marrakesh; he ensured his authority over this city and followed the example of his father in his conduct, until the moment where Moulay Rashid seized Marrakesh.

On July 31, 1668 (21 Safar 1079 AH), from Dila', Moulay Rashid put himself in campaign against Abu Bakr ben Abdul Karim al-Hajj Al-Shabani, son of the usurper of the Saadis in Marrakesh. In his descent from Dila', after conducting a casual lateral campaign into the Jbel Ayachi, a north western range of the High Atlas, the northern column of his army was able to promptly enter the southern capital.

During the battle for Marrakesh, Abu Bakr and his band of ill-trained men made some resistance to Moulay Rashid but ultimately their disorder caused them to fail. Especially when Moulay Rashid first giving on Abu Bakr, found the Marrakshi siding with him since they did not hold in heart their Chabanate rulers. Real resistance was not met, and Moulay Rashid conquered the city of Marrakesh as abandoned, Abu Bakr ben Abdul Karim al-Hajj Al-Shabani fled the city for the mountains with few partisans. His escape was cut short however, with Moulay Rashid's men capturing him and bringing him to their sultan. Moulay Rashid immediately executed him after having had him dragged on the tail of a mule. Along with Abu Bakr, a number of other living members of the family of Kerroum al-Hajj were executed. According to al-Ifrani in nozhet al-hadi:

Moulay Rashid promised peace to the inhabitants in Marrakesh who in turn swore to remain loyal to him. They implored Moulay Rashid to remove the body of Abdul Karim Abu Bakr Al-Shabani from the Saadian Tombs, because he was a putschist who reached power by treason. In great symbolism, Moulay Rashid had the corps of the regicide exhumed from its place within the Saadian Tombs and burned.

This enterprise archived, he called for the children of the late Sultan Ahmad al-Abbas al-Saadi, who were locked up in a tower since the fall of their dynasty. He found his children very young of age. He sent them all, along with their widowed mother, in Fez to live there. Except for Ahmad al-Abbas' eldest daughter Lalla Mariem, who was solemnly wedded to his nephew Moulay Ahmed ben Mehrez, whom he subsequently named Khalifa of Marrakesh. Moulay Rashid left with his nephew most of his troops, mainly to secure this newly conquered territories and to subdue to his rule the remaining scattered Chabanate tribe in the Houz. He also appointed Abdelaziz A'aras, his brother-in-law, as Chief advisor to the teenaged Moulay Ahmed ben Mehrez.

Sultan of Morocco

Consolidating his reign 
After his two successful campaigns on the Dilaites and the Chabanate rulers of Marrakesh, Moulay Rashid conquered all the comprised territories, being respectively the Middle Atlas, the western plains and Marrakesh. He was now sultan of Morocco as having conquered the two imperial capitals of Fez, in 1666, and Marrakesh, in 1668.

In October 1668, from Marrakesh he went back to Fez with 4000 men leaving most of his troops in Marrakesh, his new military base for his future southern conquests. Moulay Rashid withdrew the duties of mufti of Fez from Mohammed ben Ahmed El Fassi, and also dismissed, on December 4, 1668 (29 Jumada II AH), the qadi Elmezouâr. He replaced the latter by the faqīh Aboû 'Abdallah Mobammed ben Elhasan Elmeggâsi and appointed as preacher of the Al-Qarawiyyin Mosque the faqīh Aboû 'Abdallah Mobammed Elboû'inâni.

Early the next year, on February 8, 1669, he notably pardoned the exiled Dilaites and allowed them to go back home, except for Abu Abdallah Mohammed al-Murabit al-Dila'i whom along with his children were sent in exile in Tlemcen. He would die there, while his children would have their exile lifted during Moulay Ismail's reign upon people interceding in their favor.

Moulay Rashid established Marrakesh as his military base as it being the doorway to the Houz, Anti-Atlas and Sous. The Sous was since 1614 independently ruled by Aboulhasen Ali ben Mohammed Essoussi Essemlali (nicknamed Bou Hasen or Bou Hassoun), former nemesis of his brother Muhammad ibn Sharif. In the 1640s he created the Zaouia of Illigh, and after his death in 1660, his son Abou Abdallah Mohammed ben Bou Hassoun succeeded him at the head of the zaouia. In spring of 1670, Moulay Rashid launched a military expedition to conquer the Sous.

Conquest of the Sous 
A conquest of the entire Sous was ambitious, in addition to a mountain range the region had its man-made defenses:

Their firearms and associated gunpowder were largely of local manufacture but could be respected by a European commentator as recorded in the Journal de Saint-Amans, written by Louis XIV's Ambassador of France to Morocco.

Before departing on campaign for the Sous, Moulay Rashid appointed his half-brother Moulay Ismail as Khalifa of Fez during his absence.

The Chabanate gave a hard time to Moulay Ahmed, who was sick at the time. The sultan had left Fez in haste on the news of his nephew's defeat. At the end of March 1670 he arrived in Marrakesh and Moulay Ahmed, who in the meantime had been able to launch a new offensive on the Chabanate, left camp for Marrakesh and reported to the sultan on his success. Moulay Ahmed was favorably received by the Moulay Rashid and from then on the latter took the reins of operations, the war against the Chabanate was yet to be concluded after the Alawis' recent victory. He marched against them and summoned them to yield combat and to swear allegiance to him. Moulay Rashid furthermore swore them good treatment and equal pay to new arms men from themselves as that of his current soldiers. The Chabanate won over by such beautiful proposals, surrendered and their sheikhs swore allegiance to Moulay Rashid.

Moulay Rashid had expanded his armies of further 6,000 Chabanate horsemen, he then began his conquest of the Sous, starting in Haha province (between Essaouira and Agadir). Upon learning of Moulay Rashid's march against them, along with the Chabanate who swore allegiance to him, the once resolved to fight sheikhs of Haha now thought only to surrender to Moulay Rashid. Thus, upon his arrival in their province they went to greet him with presents and oath of loyalty and fidelity. Moulay Rashid received their allegiance. His ranks were now composed of 25 000 horsemen and 48 000 infantry men, all with good pay. They were mainly armed with bow and arrow and scimitars, they also had sling and mace for weapon. He deliberated to push on Agadir which he did by taking the coastal route southward. At that point he turned east, approaching the western range of Anti-Atlas Mountains which separated the Sous from the northern provinces, and penetrated Sous. Moulay Rashid wanted to eliminate Illigh as a node of political power. During the end of that decade the 1660s, the zaouia of Illigh was experience complex internecine divisions which would be a culminating point playing in favor of the sultan's ongoing conquest.

Taroudant was easily subdued to Moulay Rashid's troops in 1670. It is not clear when it happened and if he led the offensive. The conquering of Taroudant was probably led by one of Moulay Rashid's officers. But in all for Taroudant the Hestouka were decimated, to whom 1,500 men were killed. Afterwards, the Berbers of western Anti-Atlas Mountains gathered to dispute Moulay Rashid's army crossing of their mountain range. They were resolved to fight and defend their dominions more than the inhabitants of Taroudant. The battle lasted many days, the mountain pass was successfully disputed until a part of them betrayed the others. The ones who betrayed the resistance were those who were stationed backward of the mountain pass. They had in handing all the belongings of those fighting in advance and their own. Scheming to steal it, they sent to tell the sultan to boldly give in and that they would assist by attacking from behind. Thus, those who were betrayed were attacked frontally and from behind ended up completely defeated.

After the battle, Moulay Rashid did not pardon any of his opponents who were still alive, the ones who had betrayed their comrades were also punished for their perfidy. As Moulay Rashid was now Master of the Atlas Mountains, he wanted to have all the belongings of the vanquished and made them pay heavy contributions. This measure put such terror in the country that the inhabitants of Agadir knowing that such a big army was coming their way resolved to surrender immediately. The Master of the city who had nothing to defend himself with, aware of the threat he incurred fled by night to Illigh capital of the Sous where resided the Sheikh Mohammed ben Bou Hassoun. Upon Moulay Rashid's approach on Agadir the inhabitants came out to meet him carrying the white flag of surrender and swore allegiance to him. He received them favorably and installed a garrison of his troops there.

The sultan then marched straight to Illigh, and set fire and blood to all the places that would not obey quickly enough. Once at Illigh's gate he besieged it, a fortified city with good walls but devoid of artillery and too populous to endure a siege. The inhabitants soon implored their sheikh to negotiate with the sultan from whom he could get a compromise. Mohammed ben Bou Hassoun's divided clan definitively lost to Moulay Rashid the control of major Susi economic centers, including Taroudant. And having no more provisions than the others and feeling threatened by his people who were proclaiming, despite the veneration they held him in, that they would compromise with the sultan, he thought of at least putting himself and his family in safety. So, at midnight through a secret door of his palace, along with his family he took flight to an allied "kingdom of the Sudan" of Bambara Segu. Meanwhile, the sultan pierced the walls of the city and the bourgeois who wanted to surrender went to find their sheikh but learned that he'd fled. As they were now retained by no one, they sent two of their marabouts to the sultan to deal with the conditions of their surrender, which were granted to them. Then the people came out before the sultan shouting "Long live Moulay Rashid" and received the Governor and the garrison that he gave them.

When Moulay Rashid attacked the people of Sahel they lost more than 11,000 men. During the siege for Illigh, who fell the 19 July 1670, it was more than 200 men who perished at the foot of the mountain. By this expedition, he made himself master of the Soùs.

Much of the profit of the Susi campaign was ploughed back to the capital. A Fasi building program gives some indication of the scale of these profits. Into this program a library was added to the southern face of the Qarawiyyin Mosque and the Cherratine Madrasa was built. Also, a new palace was built in Fes Jdid, for Moulay Rashid himself.

Death 
At 42 years-old, Moulay Rachis died in Marrakesh on April 9, 1672, after a fall from his horse. He was succeeded by his half-brother Moulay Ismail, who was his first lieutenant, his regent in 1669, when Moulay Rashid was campaigning south after his conquest of Marrakesh and his Khalifa of Meknes since late 1666.

Al-Rashid was sometimes known as "Tafiletta" by the English.

Landmark constructions 

His reign was paced by a number of infrastructure constructions which contributed to travel enhancement. On Saturday April 15, 1669 (14 Dhu al-Qadah 1079 AH), Moulay Rashid ordered the construction of four arches of the Oued Sebou Bridge, near Fez. Materials were immediately prepared and the foundations were dug up. On November 10 (5 Jumada II AH), the building of the bridge began using bricks and lime: it was soon completed in 1670, as eight unequal arches of 150 meters. In February 1671, the bridge Errecîf in Fez was built. Moulay Rashid left certain works that recall his memory. Thus, during one of his expeditions, he built in the Sahara, in the locality called Echchott, a large number of wells called Abar Essoultan (the sultan's wells) in memory of him, and which serve to supply water to the Hajj (pilgrimage) caravan.

In the science field, Moulay Rashid undertook, on December 14, 1670 (1st Sha'ban AH) the construction of the Cherratine Madrasa, at Dâr Elbâcha 'Azzoùz, in Fez. He also ordered the construction of the Qasbat Eljedida in Fez. It is located on the site of the houses of Lemtoùn and the 'Arsat bin Salah. He gave these people and their caids 1,000 mithqals for the construction of the wall, and prescribed them to build houses inside the kasbah.

In Marrakesh, he ordered to build a large madrasa next to the mosque of Sheikh Abu 'Abdallâh Mohammed bin Salal.

Military reforms 
The Cheraga is a denomination used to name the Eastern tribes both Arabs and Berbers, they include: the Cheja', Beni 'Amér among the Arab tribes, and among the Berbers: the Medioùna, Howâra and Beni Snoùs. Moulay Rashid, registered them as guich tribes. He also provides the Cheraga with 1,000 dinars for the construction of the Kasbah Cherarda, where they came to live in. They had been installed first in the vicinity of Fez; but the dwellers having had to complain of the damage they were causing them, Moulay Rashid had ordered them to move their camp to the territories of Saddina and Fichtâla, between the Sbou and the Ouarga, of which he gave them in fief the lands. He separated those of them who were celibate and made them build their houses apart.

Economic reforms 

In May 1669, he minted the Rechîdiya currency and lent for one year a sum of 1052 mithqal to the merchants of Fez to trade. Its circulation brought an end to the currency crisis which the previous decade have been plagued with.

In October 1670, Moulay Rashid minted round copper floûs, which replaced as current currency the square coinage called Elouchqoubiya. The sultan decided that henceforth there would be 24 of these floûs for a mouzoûna, instead of 48. A mouzoûna (silver coins), weighing 1.1724 grams, being the weight of a quarter of the Saadi gold mithqal. However, coins minted during the Saadi era were kept in use by Moroccans at that time.

Personal life 
Sultan Moulay Rashid married twice in his life, in a polygamous marriage. In the summer of 1666, he first married a daughter of Sheikh Al-Lawati of the Beni Snassen or Arab Maqil. Later the same year, he married secondly to a daughter of the restored Abdallah A'aras. He had a harem of slave concubines, one of them a Spanish captive he favored over all his women, he lodged her in the most richly decorated apartments of his harem. Another of his slave concubines was Lalla Aisha Mubarka. Of his marriages he had two sons, but the number of his female offspring are not recorded. Historic chronicles do not precisely describe which wife mothered which child.

After his death in April 1672, his widowed first wife is recorded to have been wedded by Sultan Moulay Ismail. Moulay Rashid's sons were not kept as heirs to their father as they were infant sons. The 'Alawi dynasty did not allow infant sons to inherit the throne, it was out of the question. As considered unwise, a regency was permitted only for male heirs in their early teens, which was the case for the future Sultan Moulay Abdelaziz. Moulay Rashid's sons were kept in the guardianship of their half-uncle Moulay Ismail who succeeded their father.

In 1680, Sultan Moulay Ismail who was until then guardian of Moulay Rashid's sons, sent them along with his eldest son Abu'al'Ala Prince Moulay Mohammed Mehrez to live in Tafilalt.

Character 
Young Moulay Rashid was described as a proud and ambitious man. Moroccan historians portray him as a wise man, and gifted with political wisdom. He has been recorded to show great respect to scholars, he honored them, sought their company and was generous to them everywhere. Under his reign science flourished and scholars enjoyed great honor and consideration. People who met him described him as a man of great liberality and simplicity. One day, he sent for a scholar to read a book with him. This scholar refused to come, and responses with the saying of Imam Mālik: "One comes to science, she does not come to you." Moulay Rashid often went to the house of this scholar and studied under his direction. According to al-Qadiri's Nachr Elmatsani (The Chronicles), he assisted the lessons of Sheikh al-Yusi at the University of al-Qarawiyyin.

See also 
 List of Kings of Morocco
 History of Morocco

References 

1631 births
1672 deaths
Moroccan people of Arab descent
People from Tafilalt
'Alawi dynasty monarchs
17th-century Moroccan people
17th-century monarchs in Africa
17th-century Arabs
Deaths by horse-riding accident
People from Rissani